Raymond Edward Menmuir (10 September 1930 – 26 March 2016) was a British-Australian director and producer. His career included producing 44 episodes of The Professionals and directing 12 episodes of Upstairs, Downstairs. He also produced an Australian version of The Professionals called Special Squad for the Ten Network in 1984.

Early life
Menmuir was born in Perth, Western Australia, as the eldest of four children to Edward Menmuir and his wife Dorothy (née Williams). His father ensured Menmuir had a good education, at Wesley College.

Work
His first employment was as a reporter at the Perth Daily News, but he then transferred to the Australian Broadcasting Commission as a radio producer.

He was deeply impressed by European culture, by seeing various films at the 1953 Festival of the Arts in Perth, and then took artistic inspiration from various films including Marcel Pagnol's Cesar, Vittorio de Sica's Bicycle Thieves, and Mikhail Kalatozov's The Cranes are Flying. This came out when he was soon directing dramas at the ABC's television drama department in Sydney. He directed the second play to be televised, J.B. Priestly's The Rose and Crown written specifically for television, and the first play from the new (1958) Gore Hill complex, Barbara Vernon's The Multi-Coloured Umbrella. Annette Andre recalled him as "a good director, he knew what he was doing."

He originally directed all sorts of programs for the ABC but in October 1959 was assigned to drama full time.

Probably his greatest achievement in these years was the 5 October 1960 live production in prime time of the two-hour epic Shakespeare play, The Life and Death of King Richard II, using all three studios at Gore Hill.

In 1961, Menmuir and his then wife Heidi moved to London. Menmuir directed for stage Alan Seymour's play, The One Day of the Year at Theatre Royal Stratford East, which started his association with many production venues.

His productions included: Z Cars, The Avengers, No Hiding Place, Corridors of Power, and The Duchess of Duke Street. In 1974 he directed the adaptation of the Lord Peter Wimsey story The Nine Tailors for the BBC.

In 1978, he was offered full freedom of control as producer for London Weekend Television's show, The Professionals.

During several returns to Australia, he was responsible for Ballad for One Gun (1963) (about Ned Kelly), and Special Squad and the movie Fortress for Crawford Productions.

Personal life
In the UK, Menmuir lived in rural Buckinghamshire.

In his later years, Menmuir settled in Australia at Mirrabooka on the western side of Lake Macquarie

Menmuir was married twice, to Heidi (née Isenmann) and they had a daughter Anna, and to Jennifer (née Cooper) (d. 2010) with whom he had a daughter Fiona and son Iain. He then had a partner, Wendy Blacklock.

Select Credits
Shadow of Doubt (1957) - TV play
The Rose and Crown (1957) - TV play
The Multi-Coloured Umbrella (1958) - TV play
Citizen of Westminster (1958) - TV play
Blue Murder (1959) - TV play
One Bright Day (1959) - TV play
Bodgie (1959) - TV play
The Strong Are Lonely (1959) - TV play
The Life and Death of King Richard II (1960) - TV play
Close to the Roof (1960) - TV play
The Dock Brief (1960) - TV play
The Square Ring (1960) - TV play
Swamp Creatures (1960) - TV play
Turning Point (1960) - TV play
The Sergeant from Burralee (1961) - TV play
The Right Thing (1963) - TV play
Ballad for One Gun (1963) - TV play
Thirty-One Backyards (1965) - TV play
Headmaster (1977) (TV series)
The Professionals (1978–83) - TV series
Who Dares Wins (1982)
Special Squad (1984) (TV series)
Fortress (1985)
C.A.T.S. Eyes (1986–87) (TV Series)
Gentlemen and Players (1988–89) (TV Series)

References

External links
 
NFSA - Search Results Raymond Menmuir] at National Film and Sound Archive
Obituary at Sydney Morning Herald''
Obituary by Storry Walton

1930 births
2016 deaths
Australian television directors
Australian television producers
British television directors
British television producers